The Furka Oberalp Bahn Ge 4/4 III, now known as the Matterhorn Gotthard Bahn Ge 4/4 III, is a two member class of metre gauge electric locomotives operated until 2002 by the Furka Oberalp Bahn (FO), and since then by its successor, the Matterhorn Gotthard Bahn, between the Cantons of Valais and Uri in southern Switzerland.

History 
The Furka Oberalp Bahn (FO) acquired these Bo′Bo′ locomotives in 1979 for the purpose of hauling car shuttle trains through the then forthcoming Furka Base Tunnel.

Between the delivery of these locomotives and the completion of the Furka Base Tunnel, both members of the class were leased to the Rhaetian Railway, where they entered service hauling express trains on the Albula Railway.  Since the opening of the Base Tunnel in 1982, they have been used exclusively on car shuttle trains between Oberwald and Realp.

On , the locomotives became the property of the Matterhorn Gotthard Bahn (MGB), following a merger between the FO and the Brig-Visp-Zermatt railway (BVZ).

Technical details 
The two locomotives represent a further development of the Ge 4/4 II class of the Rhaetian Railway.  They are therefore classified as Ge 4/4 III under the Swiss locomotive and railcar classification system, even though the FO had not previously operated Ge 4/4 type locomotives. According to the Swiss classification system, Ge 4/4 III denotes a third series of narrow gauge electric adhesion locomotives with four axles, all of which are drive axles.

They are the only mainline locomotives of the MGB not fitted with cogwheels for rack railway operations.

List of locomotives

Gallery

See also 

 Furka Pass
 Oberalp Pass
 History of rail transport in Switzerland
 Rail transport in Switzerland

References

External links

 Matterhorn Gotthard Bahn

This article is based upon a translation of the German-language version as at July 2010.

SLM locomotives
Brown, Boveri & Cie locomotives
Bo′Bo′ locomotives
Electric locomotives of Switzerland
11 kV AC locomotives
Matterhorn Gotthard Bahn locomotives
Railway locomotives introduced in 1979
Metre gauge electric locomotives